Te Heke-rangatira-ki-Nukutaurua Boyd (c. 1886 – 29 May 1959) was a New Zealand tribal leader and interpreter. Of Māori descent, she identified with the Ngāti Moe iwi.

Biography
She was born in Greytown, Wairarapa in c.1886.

References

1880s births
1959 deaths
Year of birth uncertain
Interpreters
Ngāti Kahungunu people
People from Greytown, New Zealand
20th-century translators
New Zealand Māori women